Statistics of Primera División Argentina in season 1984.

Nacional Championship

Group stages

Knockout stages

Final

Ferro Carril Oeste won on aggregate 4–0.

Metropolitano Championship

League table

Relegation table

See also
1984 in Argentine football

References

Argentine Primera División seasons
Primera Division
Arg
p
p